Vysotsky, Vysotskiy, Wissotzky or Vyssotsky is a Slavic masculine surname, its feminine counterpart is Vysotskaya, Wissotzkaya or Vysotskaia. It may refer to

Aleksey Vysotsky (1919–1977), Russian journalist
Alexander Vysotsky (born 1968), former professional ice hockey player from Kazakhstan
Alexander Vyssotsky (1888–1973), Russian-American astronomer
Emma Vyssotsky (1894–1975), American astronomer
Georgy Vysotsky (1865–1940), Ukrainian forester and ecologist
Ida Wissotzkaya, an intimate friend of the Russian writer Boris Pasternak
Igor Vysotsky (born 1953), Soviet amateur boxer
Ivan Vysotskiy (born 1962), Ukrainian rower
Julia Vysotskaya (born 1973), Russian actress and television presenter
Kalonimus Wolf Wissotzky (1824–1904), Russian tea merchant, relative of Ida 
Maksim Vysotskiy (born 1995), Belarusian football player
Nadzeya Vysotskaya (born 1988), Belarusian artistic gymnast
Victor A. Vyssotsky (1931–2012), American mathematician and computer scientist, son of Alexander Vyssotsky 
Vladimir Vysotsky (1938–1980), Russian singer/songwriter, actor, and poet
Vladimir Vysotsky (admiral) (1954–2021), Russian admiral

See also
Wysocki